Hilarographa obinana is a species of moth of the family Tortricidae. It is found on Obi Major Island in the Moluccas, within Indonesia.

The wingspan is about 11 mm. The ground colour of the forewings is orange cream, more cream in the dorso-median part of the wing and more orange in the posterior third. The hindwings are brownish, but creamier basally.

Etymology
The name refers to its native Obi Major Island.

References

Moths described in 2009
Hilarographini